"Cantaloop (Flip Fantasia)" is a song by British jazz-rap group Us3, originally released in October 1992 as the lead single from their debut album, Hand On the Torch (1993). The song was recorded as a demo a year before the group's first release and features a sample of Herbie Hancock's song "Cantaloupe Island". Another sample, the announcement by Pee Wee Marquette, is taken from the Blue Note album A Night at Birdland, Vol. 1 by The Art Blakey Quintet. "Cantaloop (Flip Fantasia)" did not chart in the group's native UK, but in the US, it reached No. 9 on the Billboard Hot 100, becoming the group's only top 40 single. It was subsequently re-released in UK where it peaked at No. 23. The song was certified gold by the Recording Industry Association of America (RIAA) on March 25, 1994 for selling over 500,000 copies.

Critical reception
Ron Wynn from AllMusic stated that "when words and music mesh", as on "Cantaloop (Flip Fantasia)", "Us3 show how effectively hip-hop and jazz can blend." Another editor, Stewart Mason, complimented it as "excellent" and "probably the best acid jazz single ever". Larry Flick from Billboard said, "Tired of the same old urban grind? Here's just what you need: a zesty stew of traditional jazz-fusion, hip-hop, and classic funk. Live horns (with a trumpet solo that works!), imaginative use of samples from Herbie Hancock's "Cantaloop Island", and diggy-diggy-bop rapping render this an essential playlist addition." The Daily Vault's Christopher Thelen noted its "trip-hop mood". David Hajdu from Entertainment Weekly named the song "one of the best singles of the year". Linda Ryan from the Gavin Report commented, "It just doesn't get cooler than this! US3 combine jazz, hip-hop and house grooves for a fresh sound that begs to be discovered in a big way. If you thought Guru's Jazzmatazz was phat and all that, wait 'til you hear US3's "Cantaloop!" I prefer either the Radio Edit or the Groovy Mix. Aw, yeah." 

A reviewer from Irish Independent deemed it as "excellent". Alan Jones from Music Week named it Pick of the Week, calling it a "superb" rap and "funky, spunky, tasty, sample-strewn and cool jazz jam". Another editor, Andy Beevers, gave it four out of five, noting that the song "is even more catchy than "Tukka Yoot's Riddim". Rahsaan is the rapper this time and the vibe is funky rather than ragga influenced." Neil Spencer from The Observer declared it the "standout" of the album. Dimitri Ehrlich from Rolling Stone found that "Cantaloop" "is as easily digested as the fruit it's named after." Charles Aaron from Spin wrote, "When this gem popped out of the sound system at Madison Square Garden (Knicks 98, Clippers 77, January 11, 1994), even Woody Allen quit slouching. For the 20-second time-out, I could envision a jazz orchestra doing hip-hop repertory in a racially mixed midtown disco. And it was a really good idea." Troy J. Augusto from Variety described it as "a smooth, midtempo jazz track" that heavily samples the Herbie Hancock track.

Music video
A music video was made to accompany the song, directed by Charles Wittenmeier. It earned an award in the category for Best New Artist Clip at the 1994 Billboard Music Video Awards in Los Angeles. The video was later published on YouTube's Vevo channel in March 2009, and had generated more than 13 million views as of January 2023.

Impact and legacy
"Cantaloop (Flip Fantasia)" was awarded one of ASCAP's Rhythm & Soul Awards in 1995.

American online publication Slant Magazine listed the song at number 76 in their ranking of "The 100 Best Singles of the 1990s" in 2011, writing, "They got the beats. They got the rhymes. Us3’s sole pop hit, “Cantaloop (Flip Fantasia)”, is a cheerfully funky fusion of jazz and hip-hop—nothing more, nothing less. What it lacks in social consciousness it makes up for in musical brinkmanship: The production’s exciting explosion of frenetic horn riffs, interrupted only by a sick trumpet solo by Gerard Presencer, samples Herbie Hancock and Lou Donaldson, among others, and grooves in scary synchronicity with the uncannily delivered lyrics by one-time member Rahsaan Kelly. The mood is creative, idealistic, and laidback, suggesting the good vibes of A Tribe Called Quest and Digable Planets. It’s a sweet, slick, funky maelstrom of sound that’s also a time capsule of a gorgeously short-lived musical form. Diddi-diddi bop."

Charts

Weekly charts

Year-end charts

Appearances in other media
"Cantaloop (Flip Fantasia)"  is played in the films Super Mario Bros. (1993), Jimmy Hollywood (1994), Renaissance Man (1994), It Takes Two (1995), Sisters (2015), and The Incredible Burt Wonderstone (2013), and in the TV shows New York Undercover,  Hindsight, the Baywatch episode "Someone to Baywatch Over You" (1994) and the Australian news satire Frontline. It is also featured in the PlayStation 4 video game Knack II (2017), during the end credits showing Knack in his various sizes dancing to the song, and was used as the theme song for The Connection radio program on WBUR.

References

1992 debut singles
Us3 songs
Jazz rap songs
1992 songs
Songs written by Herbie Hancock